Internal Security Operations Command or ISOC is the political arm of the Thai military. It was responsible for the suppression of leftist groups from the 1960s to the 1980s. During this period it was implicated in atrocities against activists and civilians. ISOC was implicated in a plot to assassinate Prime Minister Thaksin Shinawatra. 

After Thaksin was deposed in a military coup, the junta transformed ISOC into a government within a government, giving it wide-reaching authority over the National Anti-Corruption Commission, the Department of Special Investigation, and the Anti-Money Laundering Office (AMLO). The junta also authorized it to help provincial authorities in marketing OTOP products. 

In June 2007, the junta approved a draft national security bill which gave ISOC sweeping powers to handle "new forms of threats" to the country. The ISOC revamp modelled it after the US Department of Homeland Security and gave ISOC sweeping new powers to allow the ISOC chief to implement security measures, such as searches without seeking prime ministerial approval.

History

Mission and organization
ISOC's mission it to suppress threats to national security, defend the monarchy, promote unity, and protect the public from harm. Nominally a civilian agency, ISOC operates under the aegis of the Office of the Prime Minister. Prime Minister General Prayut Chan-o-cha is director of ISOC. Deputy director is army chief General  Narongpan Jitkaewthae.

ISOC's FY2019 budget is 10,240.1 million baht. ISOC has about 5,000-6,000 staff nationwide, excluding those working in the south, and there are 500,000-600,000 internal security volunteers, as well as tens of thousands of people in its information network.

Communist Suppression Operations Command
The Communist Suppression Operations Command (CSOC) was established in 1965 with the assistance of the United States to coordinate nationwide anti-communist operations.

Following the 17 November 1971 coup by military dictators Thanom Kittikachorn and Praphas Charusathien, Praphas appointed himself interior minister, chief of police, and head of CSOC.

The CSOC was implicated in several atrocities in its 1970s war against leftist groups. This included the Red Drum Massacre, the mass murder of southern Thai activists by burning them alive in gasoline drums.

Student leader Thirayuth Boonmee showed evidence that the destruction of Ban Na Sai village, Bueng Kan District, Nong Khai Province (Bueng Kan Province) in northeast Thailand was the handiwork of the CSOC. The military had earlier claimed that the Communist Party of Thailand (CPT) was responsible for the village's destruction.

CSOC's name was changed to ISOC in 1974.

Operations during the 1970s
ISOC conducted operations in cities and the Thai countryside to subvert leftist groups through propaganda and violence. In 1973, the ISOC commenced a bombing campaign against hill tribe villages in northern Thailand.

Prime Minister to-be Prem Tinsulanonda was a senior officer of the ISOC.

ISOC's role declined starting in the early-1980s after the downfall of the CPT. However, it still had great influence. On 1 April 1987, after Prime Minister Kukrit Pramoj claimed that ISOC had been brainwashed by communists, over 200 Thai Army Rangers attacked the prime minister's residence.

Political intervention

Plot to assassinate Thaksin Shinawatra
ISOC Deputy Director Pallop Pinmanee was sacked after Lieutenant Thawatchai Klinchana, his driver, was found driving a car containing 67 kilograms of explosives near the residence of Prime Minister Thaksin Shinawatra. Pallop denied all involvement, noting that "If I was behind it, I would not have missed." A government spokesperson stated that the explosives in the car were completely assembled, equipped with a remote sensor ready to be detonated, and would have had a blast radius of around one kilometre.

Information Operations 
In a parliament debate in February 2020, Future Forward MP Viroj Lakkana-adisorn presented a document revealing the percentage of the Internal Security Operation Command (ISOC) budget dedicated to information warfare in Thailand's three southern provinces of Narathiwas, Songkhla, and Yala. Three additional documents detailed Defense Ministry orders to conduct information warfare against opposition parties and politicians, including specific budget details for the internet and mobile phones and the internet. As ISOC reports directly to the prime minister's office, General Prayut denied all the allegations and promised to investigate.

In October 2020, Twitter took down a "low-intensity" Royal Thai Army information operation apparently designed to stifle and influence democratic opinion on social media regarding Army scandals and democratic processes in the country, as part of a major wider investigation by Facebook and Twitter into attempts to influence the 2020 US Presidential Election.

ISOC with Thailand's coup

Post-2006 coup ISOC
ISOC received a boost when the 2006 coup installed the government of General Surayud Chulanont. His government passed the Internal Security Act, 2008, granting ISOC the status of a state organization reporting to the Office of the Prime Minister.

Thaksin planned a major restructuring of the ISOC prior to the coup which overthrew him in September 2006. Soon after the coup, the junta released three army suspects in the car bomb plot. Junta leader and Army Commander-in-Chief General Sonthi Boonyaratglin appointed himself head of ISOC (its previous head had been the prime minister) and transformed ISOC into a "government within a government". The new ISOC was criticized as being a shadowy puppet master pulling the strings of existing agencies, answerable to no one but its leader.

To protect people in south Thailand from insurgency-related violence, ISOC produced Jatukham Rammathep amulets for distribution to the Buddhist minority. The renowned animist amulets were believed to have magical powers to protect their wearers from violence and large sums are paid for them. The plan was developed by Colonel Manas Khongpan, deputy director of ISOC in Yala Province.

The cabinet of General Surayud Chulanont gave 732 ISOC staff members an 84.3 million baht "reward" in mid-2007. ISOC explained that police and soldiers were temporarily transferred to support ISOC's operation. ISOC wanted to reward them for their hard work and sacrifice. ISOC had originally requested the reward in 2003, but was turned down by the Thaksin government.

Post-2014 coup ISOC
Following the 2014 coup, junta leader Prayut Chan-o-cha used ISOC to handle not just military matters, but also political and social issues. In 2017, Prayut issued NCPO Order 51/2017 to bolster ISOC's powers. A key provision was the inclusion of public prosecutors under ISOC's ageis, marking ISOC's first involvement in the Thai justice system. The order also gave ISOC the power to summon citizens to provide "information", a function formerly seen as a police responsibility. ISOC, under the order, is also responsible for "social order", a task previously shared by the police and ministries.

In October 2019, ISOC filed sedition charges against 12 opposition politicians and academics, including leaders of Future Forward and Pheu Thai parties. They were accused of inciting insurrection against the state for discussing amendments to the junta-drafted 2017 constitution on 28 September in Pattani Province. Their choice of venue is unfortunate as Pattani operates under a "state of emergency" enacted by the army to combat local separatists. This means that the defendants may be tried in a military tribunal. A leading Thai political scientist warned that giving a militarized surveillance agency free rein in internal security issues risked turning Thailand into a totalitarian state.

ISOC Bases
 Ruen Ruedi Palace in Bangkok is the headquarters of ISOC.
 Tambon Khao Tum in Yarang District of Pattani Province is the site of Fort Sirindhorn, headquarters of ISOC Area 4.

See also
Office of the Prime Minister (Thailand)
Deep State
Operation Gladio
The King Never Smiles

References 

Political repression in Thailand
Political history of Thailand
Thai intelligence agencies
Government agencies established in 1966
1966 establishments in Thailand
Communist insurgency in Thailand
Fascism in Thailand